Madeline Secco (born 15 March 1994) is a Canadian women's field hockey player.

Secco first represented Canada in 2011, and has become a mainstay in the national team since. She has competed at one Pan American Games and two Pan American Cup's taking home a bronze medal from each.

In 2018, Secco represented Canada at the 2018 Commonwealth Games in Gold Coast, Australia. The Canadian team finished in 5th place, and Secco scored two goals at the tournament.

References

External links
 Maddie Secco at Field Hockey Canada
 
 
  (2014)
 
 Madeline Rose Secco at the Lima 2019 Pan American Games

1994 births
Living people
Canadian female field hockey players
Field hockey players from Victoria, British Columbia
Field hockey players at the 2015 Pan American Games
Pan American Games medalists in field hockey
Pan American Games bronze medalists for Canada
Field hockey players at the 2018 Commonwealth Games
Commonwealth Games competitors for Canada
Pan American Games silver medalists for Canada
Field hockey players at the 2019 Pan American Games
Medalists at the 2015 Pan American Games
Medalists at the 2019 Pan American Games
20th-century Canadian women
21st-century Canadian women